Tokoroa is the fifth-largest town in the Waikato region of the North Island of New Zealand and largest settlement in the South Waikato District. Located 30 km southwest of Rotorua, close to the foot of the Mamaku Ranges, it is midway between Taupo and Hamilton on State Highway 1.

History and culture

Early history

Tokoroa was the name of a chief of the Ngāti Kahupungapunga, who was slain by Raukawa during the siege of Pōhaturoa, a volcanic plug adjacent to Atiamuri, 27 km south of Tokoroa. This battle took place around 1600 as the Ngāti Raukawa moved into the southern Waikato. The name Tokoroa first appeared on the early maps of the 1860s, although this was for an area 50 km north east of today's Tokoroa.

Foundations, growth and decline

Tokoroa is one of the most recent towns in New Zealand history.  The township was established (circa) 1917 by the Matarawa Land Company as a potential farming area; a few families had already settled in the area after 1910, and a school with 9 pupils was founded in 1915 (later to become Tokoroa East School). The land was found to be too poor for raising cattle or sheep due to its predominant pumice soils.  However, agricultural science showed the land could actually be made to successfully support dairy cattle. The soil had serious deficiencies causing livestock to suffer from what became known as "bush sickness" (later found to be cobalt deficiency). In the 1930s, the deficiency was addressed, and subsequently, cattle farming became profitable.

Between 1925 and 1935 Pinus radiata was first introduced to the district as a commercial tree crop – the trees were found not to be adversely affected by the local soil deficiencies.  As the initial crops matured, Tokoroa was then developed as a residential satellite for Kinleith Mill workers (New Zealand Forest Products Limited's integrated timber, pulp and paper mill), approximately 8 km south of the township.  In 1948, Tokoroa had a population of 1,100. By the early 1970s, however, Tokoroa reached, for a time, a population of over 20,000 – the number necessary to be officially deemed a city.  In the 1980s years NZFP (and later, mill-owner Carter Holt Harvey Ltd) began to downscale and restructure operations at Kinleith. Since the late 1980s this ongoing downscaling at Kinleith – and closing of other local industries – resulted in a marked drop in population. Census figures put the 2018 population at approximately 14,300.

Marae

Tokoroa has two marae connected to local iwi and hapū. Ngātira Marae and Te Tikanga a Tāwhiao meeting house are associated with the Ngāti Raukawa hapū of Ngāti Ahuru and the Waikato Tainui hapū of Ngāti Korokī and Ngāti Raukawa ki Panehākua. Ōngāroto Marae and Whaita meeting house are affiliated with the Ngāti Raukawa hapū of Ngāti Whaita.

In October 2020, the Government committed $1,259,392 from the Provincial Growth Fund to upgrade Ngātira Marae and 7 other Ngāti Raukawa marae, creating 18 jobs.

Geography

Location

Surrounding the township are many dairy farms and plantation forests. There are many scenic reserves around the town – the artificial Lake Moananui (formed by damming the Matarawa Stream in 1974/75) lies within a recreational park.

Tokoroa lies in the centre of a triangle made up of the tourism destinations of Rotorua, Waitomo and Taupo.  There are also about 45 recreational lakes within less than an hour's drive of Tokoroa.

Township

As well as the central business district, the township is made up of many subdivisions, each built in different stages of the Kinleith complex's development. These subdivisions are:

Parkdale
Paraonui
Papanui
Matarawa
Aotea
Strathmore
Amisfield

Many of the street names of the town were named by the first managing director of N.Z. Forest Products Ltd.(builders of the Kinleith mill), Sir David Henry (1888–1963), after places near his hometown of Edinburgh, in Scotland. David Henry Primary School is a key example of him and his namesaking.

Demographics

Tokoroa had a population of 13,578 at the 2018 New Zealand census, an increase of 1,242 people (10.1%) since the 2013 census, and an increase of 408 people (3.1%) since the 2006 census. There were 4,629 households, comprising 6,759 males and 6,813 females, giving a sex ratio of 0.99 males per female, with 3,210 people (23.6%) aged under 15 years, 2,601 (19.2%) aged 15 to 29, 5,559 (40.9%) aged 30 to 64, and 2,199 (16.2%) aged 65 or older.

Ethnicities were 59.0% European/Pākehā, 42.7% Māori, 20.7% Pacific peoples, 4.2% Asian, and 1.4% other ethnicities. People may identify with more than one ethnicity.

The percentage of people born overseas was 13.3, compared with 27.1% nationally.

Although some people chose not to answer the census's question about religious affiliation, 49.3% had no religion, 35.6% were Christian, 3.8% had Māori religious beliefs, 0.6% were Hindu, 0.2% were Muslim, 0.4% were Buddhist and 1.4% had other religions.

Of those at least 15 years old, 798 (7.7%) people had a bachelor's or higher degree, and 3,063 (29.5%) people had no formal qualifications. 1,035 people (10.0%) earned over $70,000 compared to 17.2% nationally. The employment status of those at least 15 was that 4,260 (41.1%) people were employed full-time, 1,290 (12.4%) were part-time, and 834 (8.0%) were unemployed.

Rural surrounds

Kinleith had a population of 1,446 at the 2018 New Zealand census, a decrease of 18 people (−1.2%) since the 2013 census, and an increase of 333 people (29.9%) since the 2006 census. There were 543 households, comprising 789 males and 657 females, giving a sex ratio of 1.2 males per female. The median age was 33.8 years (compared with 37.4 years nationally), with 324 people (22.4%) aged under 15 years, 324 (22.4%) aged 15 to 29, 636 (44.0%) aged 30 to 64, and 165 (11.4%) aged 65 or older.

Ethnicities were 83.6% European/Pākehā, 19.5% Māori, 2.7% Pacific peoples, 8.5% Asian, and 1.2% other ethnicities. People may identify with more than one ethnicity.

The percentage of people born overseas was 17.0, compared with 27.1% nationally.

Although some people chose not to answer the census's question about religious affiliation, 56.0% had no religion, 32.0% were Christian, 1.5% had Māori religious beliefs, 0.6% were Hindu, 0.2% were Muslim, 0.2% were Buddhist and 3.7% had other religions.

Of those at least 15 years old, 150 (13.4%) people had a bachelor's or higher degree, and 216 (19.3%) people had no formal qualifications. The median income was $42,400, compared with $31,800 nationally. 240 people (21.4%) earned over $70,000 compared to 17.2% nationally. The employment status of those at least 15 was that 636 (56.7%) people were employed full-time, 183 (16.3%) were part-time, and 39 (3.5%) were unemployed.

Climate

Economy

The economic lifeblood of Tokoroa is forestry, centred at the nearby Kinleith Mill; and dairy farming. In 1995, Fonterra built the southern hemisphere's largest cheese factory in Lichfield, some 5 km north of the town. Due to increases in relative rates of return, large amounts of previously forested land were converted to farmland in the 2000s and 2010s.

The main agricultural activities of the district are sheep and dairy farming. Forestry is still, however, the primary and most important industry to the district.  Timber is milled and processed at Kinleith.  Over recent years, the sharp decline in timber processing has seen the majority of raw logs shipped offshore.  Most of the Kinleith workers live in Tokoroa, with a small number commuting from other South Waikato towns.  Tokoroa is a marketing and servicing centre for agriculture, inline with other associated industries.  These other industries include (but are not limited to): the manufacture of cheese (and related dairy products [via Fonterra]), specialised wooden boxing, timber joinery, saw milling, general engineering, and the quarrying of building (masonry) stone.

Although Tokoroa's economy primarily tends to revolve around timber and farming, many large retail companies have continued investing in the town – Foodstuffs recently constructed and opened a New World (supermarket) on Tokoroa's main street (Bridge Street). Also, Woolworths (a major competitor to Foodstuffs Group) also recently built New Zealand's first Countdown (supermarket) featuring bilingual (i.e. including Te Reo-Māori) signage.

Education

Tertiary education is important to Tokoroa, through Te Wānanga o Aotearoa and Toi Ohomai Institute of Technology.

Tokoroa has two secondary schools:
 Tokoroa High School, with a roll of 
 Notable alumni includes Wellington City Councillor Tamatha Paul.
 Forest View High School, with a roll of 

It has two alternative education facilities for secondary students who work better with full teacher guidance outside the classroom:

 Forest View High School Alternative Education Tautoko Kura
 Pa Harakeke Teen Parent Unit

There are three full Year 1 to 8 primary schools:

 Amisfield School, with a roll of 
 Tainui Full Primary School, with a roll of 
 Te Kura Kaupapa Māori o Te Hiringa, a Māori immersion school with a roll of 

There is one intermediate school:

 Tokoroa Intermediate, with a roll of 

Tokoroa also has a range of Year 1–6 primary schools:

Matarawa Primary School closed in 1999. Tokoroa East School closed in 2011.

Town facilities and attractions

Tokoroa has a number of Tourist and visiting attractions, as well as many facilities for local use.

Talking Poles
Since 1997, Tokoroa has been "sprouting" Talking Poles, consisting mainly of carvings representing ethnic culture, sports recreation, industry in the town and stories about the town. This one, photographed shortly after its unveiling in 2004, is a chainsaw carving of a deodar cedar which died from natural causes. It is representative of the Greenman in Welsh mythology and is located on State Highway 1, immediately adjacent to the town's information centre.

By October 2008, 42 Talking Poles were displayed around the town. Tokoroa Talking Poles symposium is convened every two years at the Tokoroa campus of Te Wananga o Aotearoa. The Greenman was carved in 2004 by Mr Andy Hankcock.

Lake Moana-Nui
Tokoroa's man-made Lake Moana-Nui was created in the late 1970s for the community, involving excavation by large earthmoving equipment and a concrete dam wall with a drain valve control. A wooden bridge located on the south-west end of the dam wall that supported and controlled the drain valve was a favourite 'bomb' spot, and barefoot skiing down the spillway was early extreme sport unique to Tokoroa. During the 1970s, 'The Lake' was used extensively by youths and was referred to in local parlance as 'Tokoroa Beach'. On many summer afternoons, it was a common sight to see youth lying on the footpath across the road from the lake drying out after a swim.

In the period following the initial construction of the dam in the late 1970s, the lake began to deteriorate due to low rainfall and poor water flows, which saw lake weed overtake the swimming areas. The lake weed eventually became a drowning hazard that claimed the lives of swimmers over the preceding decade. In this sense, the project was a failure, and Lake Moana-Nui was considered unsafe. In an effort to control the problems, signs were erected banning access to the dam wall, and basic handrailing was put up to prevent public access. The lake was subject to regular draining in an effort to control the weed and to flush out the stale, stagnant water. While this did slightly improve the situation in the short term, people were warned not to swim in it. The lake is undergoing a major cleaning project so that it can be used in the future. To date (as at 25 April 2015), Lake Moana-Nui has been fully drained, refilled, and restored – and has been cleared by the local council for public recreation (as it was in its heyday during the 1970s and 80's).

There are picnic tables built around the lakes arc and there are four playgrounds. At the southern end of Lake Moana-Nui are gardens which were planted by a collective of Tokoroa school children.

Tokoroa Airfield

Tokoroa has an airfield with an 850m sealed runway, although its use for manned aviation is somewhat limited these days.  There are no scheduled air services to or from the airfield and it sees, on average, just a dozen or so aircraft movements per month.

More frequently it is used for the flying of RC model aircraft (including very large Jet-powered models) as well as advanced driver training and drag-racing events.

Town library
The current location of Tokoroa's library holds many historic memories for the locals – as it was previously the town's cinema. It currently holds a library with a full computer suite, over 2,000 books, a reference book section, and children's leisure area. It is located in the Tokoroa town centre.

Tokoroa Hospital
Tokoroa Hospital provides limited medical services for a population of approximately 22,800 people in the South Waikato District. Currently, the hospital provides 21 beds made up of a 17-bed inpatient ward and a 4-bed maternity ward. There is also a dedicated emergency department with capacity for five patients, and a fully functional theatre suite presently used for minor day surgery. Other facilities include x-ray and laboratory services, a cafe, a helipad for patient transfer, and various allied health services. District and public health nursing, diabetes nursing specialists, occupational therapy, physiotherapy, and health social work services are also based the hospital site, which also hosts clinics with various visiting specialists. The hospital site accommodates the Tokoroa Council of Social Services (an umbrella organisation of community services), and since 2014 has also hosted the town's GP practices, a pharmacy and several other health services in a modern health campus based at the hospital's former Ward 3.

Culture and sports
Tokoroa hosts a number of sporting, cultural and music events every year including the Polynesian festival.

Polynesian Festival
Tokoroa Polynesian Festival occurs every year during September. Tokoroa's local schools and preschools give Samoan, Māori and Cook Islands performances, where you hear the Cook Island drumming and dancing and the Māori performing arts being displayed on the huge stage at the new South Waikato Events Centre, located at The Tokoroa Memorial Sports Ground. The 2009 event hosted NZ artists J.Williams and Erika.

Sports
Tokoroa being within the Waikato Province falls under the Waikato ITM Cup provincial catchment and the Chiefs Super Rugby franchise. The South Waikato district's netball associations also fall under the catchment for inclusion in the ANZ Championship, Waikato/BOP Magic franchise.

Over many decades, Tokoroa has been a natural base for strong, competitive woodchopping and sawing events. The axe long saw and chainsaw competitions, at the local A&P Shows, over many decades, have always been central to the local, timber and timber works culture of the town. As of 2018 the annual Tokoroa A&P show has been axed due to financial reasons.

Tokoroa Memorial Sports Ground

The sports ground is used every weekend and is in use throughout the weekdays. The Memorial Sports Ground includes:

 Eight full netball courts
 Eight full tennis courts
 Three full rugby fields
 Eight touch or rugby league fields
 One Soccer field
 One Rugby Union Club – Southern United Rugby Football Club (SURF)

Y.M.C.A Sports Centre
Tokoroa's Y.M.C.A hosts a number of indoor and outdoor events, such as:
 Indoor skating
 Outdoor Archery
 Indoor & Outdoor soccer (football)
 Basketball
 Netball
 Volleyball
 Indoor Hockey
 Dance classes

Transportation

Cycling
Tokoroa has a number of cycleways which link the town centre with the outlying suburbs. These cycleways consist of a mixture of dedicated cycle lanes and mixed-use cycle/walk ways. There is an extensive cycleway from Browning Street, Tokoroa that leads to Kinleith which has extensive views of the town and the Kinleith mill.

Public roads and general access
New Zealand's main arterial route, State Highway 1, runs through Tokoroa's eastern edge. Tokoroa is also accessible from the south-west via State Highway 32 (via Maraetai Road).  Tokoroa is also a non-traffic light controlled zone.

Tokoroa is served by national bus (coachline) services such as Intercity (New Zealand) and Naked Bus, operating on various routes along State Highway 1.

Railway
The Kinleith Branch line runs through Tokoroa on its route between Waharoa on the East Coast Main Trunk line, and its terminus at the Kinleith Mill to the south of the town. Most freight trains on the line travel between the Kinleith and the Port of Tauranga. There have never been any passenger services on the line.  Also, there was no longer a station, or rail-freight yard in Tokoroa, where once they existed, until a container terminal opened in 2015.

Previous to the construction of the Kinleith Mill, and the current Kinleith Branch line, a private bush tramway operated by the Taupo Totara Timber (TTT) Company, used to operate along the route of the present line along its path between Putāruru and the company's mill at Mokai, near Taupo.

The main cargo, from Kinleith, used to include: raw and processed pulp; paper products; plywood, timber, and raw logs.  With restructuring having taken its toll on processing at Kinleith, however, the predominant cargo is now raw and ring-barked logs; logs are destined for export to timber, pulp, and paper processing plants worldwide. 46 trains a week run on the branch.

Radio stations
There are several local radio stations in Tokoroa:

 Raukawa FM 90.9/95.7 MHz
 Cruise FM, locally owned community radio station broadcasting to Tokoroa 94.1FM, Mangakino-Whakamaru 104.4FM and Putaruru 107.7FM. Ph 07 88 66 939] 94.1 MHz
 Vision FM 88.5 MHz
 FRESH FM 88.3 MHz
As well as local repeaters of national radio stations – including the former site of Radio Forestland, 1ZO (1413 kHz, AM/MB):
 Radio New Zealand National 729 kHz/101.3 MHz
 Newstalk ZB 1413 kHz
 Radio Rhema 99.7 MHz
 The Hits 97.3 MHz

Notable people

Isaac Boss – honours: Hautapu RFC, Waikato RFC (NPC), Ireland rugby union International
Pero Cameron – NZ Basketball rep' (Honours: Auckland and Waikato NBL Teams; Coach of Wellington Saints NBL Championship Team, 2010; NZ Tall Blacks)
Adrian Cashmore – honours: Auckland RFC (NPC), Auckland Blues, NZ All Blacks [2 Tests]
Quade Cooper – Australian rugby union player (honours: Queensland Reds, Wallabies)
John Davies – teacher, public relations representative, Bronze medal-winning athlete (1964 Summer Olympics), and athletics coach
Stella Duffy – Novelist
Ben Hana – Wellington identity: better known as "Blanket Man" (deceased)
Tommy Hayes – Cook Islands rugby union representative
Isaac John – honours: New Zealand Warriors, Wakefield Trinity (UK), Penrith Panthers, Cook Islands Rugby League, New Zealand Kiwis
Richard Kahui – honours: Waikato RFC (NPC), Highlanders, Waikato/BOP Chiefs, NZ All Blacks [17 Tests]
Bob Kerr – author, artist and illustrator
Paul Koteka (Tohoa Tauroa Paul ("Bam Bam") Koteka) – Honours: Tokoroa HSOB RFC, Pirates RFC, NZ Juniors, Waikato RFC (NPC), NZ Māori, NZ All Blacks [2 Tests], Western Australia RFC (93 caps; later Captain of WA State Team) 
Nicky Little – International honours: Fiji Rugby Union representative (nephew of Walter Little)
Walter Little – honours: North Harbour RFC, Waikato/BOP Chiefs, Auckland Blues, NZ All Blacks [50 Tests]
Kendrick Lynn – rugby union player
Sean Maitland – honours: NZ U-20 Rugby Union Team (World Cup Champions), Canterbury Crusaders, Glasgow Warriors, Scotland
Joseph Manu – honours: Junior Kiwis (2015) and NRL Sydney Roosters (2016-), Back to Back NRL Grand Final Winner 2018 / 2019
Keven Mealamu – honours: Auckland RFC, Auckland Blues, Waikato/BOP Chiefs, NZ All Blacks [123 Tests]
Jenny Morris –  New Zealand/Australian singer/songwriter, The Crocodiles; Models and INXS
Henry Paul – New Zealand (Kiwis) rugby league representative
Robbie Paul – New Zealand (Kiwis) rugby league representative
Jordan Rakei – neo-soul singer based in London
The Politicians – rock/new wave/reggae band formed in 1981 by Tim Armstrong.
Sir Paul Reeves – Anglican priest, Archbishop, diplomat, former Governor-General of New Zealand
Bruce Simpson – blogger and jet-engine experimenter
Brian Tamaki – founder of Destiny Church
Zane Tetevano – honours: Newcastle Knights RL (2011), Cook Islands Rugby league Representative, Sydney Roosters, NRL Grand Final Winner 2018
Maria Tutaia – New Zealand netball representative (honours: Waikato/BOP Magic, Northern Mystics, Silver Ferns)
Monique Williams – New Zealand sprinter (honours: selection at NZ representative levels)
Royce Willis – honours: BOP RFC, Waikato RFC, Auckland Blues, Waikato/BOP Chiefs, NZ All Blacks [12 Tests]

Notes and references

External links
South Waikato district council website
Tokoroa Information resource
Tokoroa High School

 
Populated places in Waikato
South Waikato District